Princess Josephine of Denmark, Countess of Monpezat (Josephine Sophia Ivalo Mathilda; born 8 January 2011) is a member of the Danish royal family. She is the fourth and youngest child of Crown Prince Frederik and Crown Princess Mary, and the seventh grandchild of Queen Margrethe II of Denmark and the late Prince Henrik. She is the twin sister of Prince Vincent.
Josephine is fifth in line to the Danish throne, after her father and older siblings, Prince Christian, Princess Isabella, and her elder twin brother.

Birth and christening

Josephine was born at Rigshospitalet, the Copenhagen University Hospital, in Copenhagen, at 10:56 am local time, 26 minutes after her twin brother.

Josephine and Vincent were christened on 14 April 2011, at the chapel of the Church of Holmen. The Princess's name was announced as Josephine Sophia Ivalo Mathilda. Her third name, Ivalo, is Greenlandic. It stems from the Qaanaaq region where her father patrolled with the Sirius Dog Sled Patrol and means "sinew". Her godparents are her paternal aunt, Princess Marie of Denmark; her maternal aunt, Patricia Bailey; as well as her parents' friends Prince Carlo, Duke of Castro, Count Bendt Wedell, Birgitte Handwerk and Josephine Rechner. Josephine wore a christening gown found among her great-grandmother Queen Ingrid's belongings, making her the first child of a future Danish monarch not to wear the Danish royal family's traditional christening gown (which was worn by her twin brother) since it was taken into use in 1870.

Public appearances and education
On 3 August 2014, during the family's official visit to Greenland, Josephine, her parents and siblings, took part in a tree planting in Qaqortoq's new poplar grove, Ivalos og Miniks Poppellund, named after Josephine and her brother who are known by their Greenlandic middle names in Greenland.

On 15 August 2017, Josephine and her twin brother started school at Tranegårdsskolen in Gentofte – the same public school as her older siblings.

Titles and styles

Josephine is styled as Her Royal Highness Princess Josephine of Denmark, Countess of Monpezat.

References

External links
 Official website

|-

Danish princesses
House of Monpezat
2011 births
Living people
Royal children
Countesses of Monpezat
Danish twins
Danish people of Australian descent
Danish people of Scottish descent
Danish people of French descent